Arne Swabeck (1890–1986) was an American Communist leader.

Swabeck was born in Denmark and emigrated to the United States where he became one of the founding members of the Communist Party. In the late 1920s he was expelled from the party as a Trotskyist and worked together with James P. Cannon and other American Trotskyists to create the Socialist Workers Party. Swabeck visited Leon Trotsky in his exile in Turkey in 1933.

In the late 1950s, Arne Swabeck became a Maoist and left the SWP in 1967.

For a number of years, he was in the Progressive Labor Party.

In 1980, Swabeck appeared as himself in the movie Reds.  He is briefly interviewed as one of a series of elderly witnesses to events described in the movie.
Arne Swabeck wrote the book entitled The Split of the Socialist Party, (New England Free Press, 1969).

External links
 Arne Swabeck Archive
 

1890 births
1986 deaths
American communists
American Trotskyists
Danish emigrants to the United States
Industrial Workers of the World members
Members of the Communist Party USA
Members of the Socialist Workers Party (United States)